Neil Pauffley is a British professional tennis player. He plays right handed. Neil has won 5 ITF Pro Futures Titles (4 x $10K & 1 x $15K) including his biggest victory of his career thus far, winning the AEGON ITF $15K Futures tournament in Tipton, West Midlands.

Career
He plays right handed and was born at Wexham Park Hospital in Slough on 29 March 1990, and was brought up in Maidenhead, Berkshire, by his Mother Gill, a school teaching Assistant. He has a brother Adam, who also played Tennis as a County level Junior for Berkshire.

He attended Court House Junior School and Altwood Church of England School, both in Maidenhead, Berkshire. He currently lives with his family in Maidenhead

Having first got into Tennis whilst accompanying his brother Adam to tennis sessions at Bisham Abbey. Neil was talent spotted and under the coaching of Russian Viktor Roubanov, played for Berkshire County alongside establishing himself on the Junior tour; appearing at Wimbledon, the Australian Open and qualifiers for the French and US Open junior tournaments.

As a junior, he beat future World Number 3 Milos Raonic of Canada, and played other future top 50 players David Goffin (lost), Donald Young (lost) and Dušan Lajović (won).

He has trained at Bisham Abbey, the LTA National Tennis Centre in Roehampton, Nottingham Performance Academy and now trains at David Lloyd Tennis Centre in Newbury.

After turning pro in 2008, he reached his first final in a Futures tournament in Ilkley, West Yorkshire in July 2009, losing to Martin Fischer of Austria, after beating future Top 120 ranked player Riccardo Ghedin of Italy.

In June 2010, he suffered a serious knee injury that resulted in him being out of the sport for over 12 months, and on his return a stress fracture of the shin and twisted ankle saw much of 2011 written off too.

His return to the court in March 2012, saw him reach the semi-finals of the Futures tournament at Tipton, and in September of that year he secured his first title winning the Germany F17 Futures Final with a 6–4, 6–4 win over German Stefan Seifert  in Hambach on an indoor carpet court.

A month later he reached the semi-final of the British Futures at Glasgow, after beating Daniel Evans and in November secured his second title, when winning the Czech F8 Futures title in Opava, Czech Republic with a 6–4, 2–6, 6–4 win over Roman Jebavý of the Czech Republic again on an Indoor carpet court.

In May 2013, he reached the final of the Portuguese F7 Futures event in Coimbra, losing to Joao Domingues, and in July 2013 he reached another final, in Felixstowe, losing to Marcus Willis.

On 12 August 2013, he reached his highest ranking so far of 406, and in November 2013 he won the German Futures title at Hambach for the second year running.

In April 2014, he reached the final of the British Futures in Edinburgh, again losing to Marcus Willis, but injury again interrupted his rise up the rankings, although the year ended well when he beat Josh Goodall to claim the British Tour Masters Trophy  in Nottingham in December.

Financial restraints meant that Pauffley had to schedule his appearances on the ITF Tennis tour around Coaching engagements at Downe House School for much of 2015, but he has ended the year well, following a semi Final appearance at the British Futures in September 2015 at Nottingham, with the biggest win of his career yet, when securing the 15K British Futures in November at Tipton, with a 6–4, 7–6(8) win over Lloyd Glasspool.

Challenger and Futures finals

Singles: 12 (5–7)

Doubles: 11 (2–9)

References

External links
 
 

English male tennis players
Living people
People from Maidenhead
Sportspeople from Derby
British male tennis players
1990 births
Tennis people from Berkshire